Cuauhtémoc is a municipality in the Mexican state of Colima. Its municipal seat is the city of Cuauhtémoc, Colima.

The municipality of Cuauhtémoc covers a total surface area of 373.2  km². In the 2005 INEGI Census, it reported a total population of 25,576 (down from 26,771 five year earlier),
of whom 7,513 lived in the municipal seat.

The municipality was created on 15 January 1915. Its name honours the last tlatoani of the Aztec people, Cuauhtemoc.

Settlements in the municipality

All the municipality's other settlements have fewer than 1,000 inhabitants.

Government

Municipal presidents

References

Municipalities of Colima